The 1956 Football Championship of UkrSSR were part of the 1956 Soviet republican football competitions in the Soviet Ukraine.

Qualification group stage

Group 1

Group 2

Group 3

Group 4

Group 5

Group 6

Group 7

Final

Champion's title replay series
 FC Shakhtar Kadiivka – FC Mashynobudivnyk Kyiv 1:1, 0:0 , 2:0

Promotion play-off
 FC Kharchovyk Odessa – FC Shakhtar Kadiivka 2:1 1:1

References

External links
 1956. Football Championship of the UkrSSR (1956. Первенство УССР.) Luhansk Nash Futbol.
 Group 1: ukr-football.org.ua
 Group 2: ukr-football.org.ua
 Group 3: ukr-football.org.ua
 Group 4: ukr-football.org.ua
 Group 5: ukr-football.org.ua
 Group 6: ukr-football.org.ua
 Final: ukr-football.org.ua

Ukraine
Football Championship of the Ukrainian SSR
Championship